The former Britannia Centre Spandau, previously known as British Forces Families Centre (BFFC), was built in 1990 by the PSA for the British Authorities on the site where Spandau Prison was once located.

Britannia Centre Spandau centralised the main shopping, welfare, employment and broadcasting facilities for the British military community in Berlin.

The Britannia Centre consisted of a new shopping and cinema complex, as well as five existing and completely refurbished two and three-story buildings. It was opened in phases between September 1990 and mid-1991.

Its buildings are located at the junction of Wilhelmstraße and Gatower Straße next to the former Smuts Barracks in the Wilhelmstadt in Spandau.

Facilities

Shopping centre
SSVC – Sound and Vision Centre
British Forces Post Office – sub office
NAAFI Financial Services
His & Hers Hair Studio
YMCA – book and gift shop
NAAFI – "A-type" shop
Burger King restaurant

Cinema complex
Jerboa cinema (with 230 seats) 
Public information area
Bus waiting area
Bank cash point (ATM)

Existing buildings
NAAFI – Area administration
NAAFI – Imperial Staff Club
Wool shop
HIVE
YMCA administration and staff facilities
Child minding centre
BMWS – Berlin Military Welfare Service
Brigade Travel Office
Thrift shop
RAOC tailor facility
Complex manager
Station Staff Office (SSO)
Community RMP Office
PCLU
Anglo-German Club
SSVC engineering workshops
BFBS studios and offices

History
On 1 August 1946, the Summit House on Theodor-Heuss-Platz was formally opened as a NAAFI Club and was adapted to the changing needs over the years. In 1977 a study recommended the construction of a new facility. At the same time the future of Spandau Prison was put to diplomatic negotiations. In 1982 a Four Power Agreement was reached, which included a statement from the Governing Mayor of Berlin, Richard von Weizsäcker, that Spandau Prison should be demolished as quickly as possible after the death of its lone inmate Rudolf Hess.

Five weeks after the death of Hess on 17 August 1987 at 1610 hours, the demolition of Spandau Prison began and was completed on 4 November 1987.

In May 1988 the construction of the new facility started and was finished on 18 September 1990. The name Britannia Centre was chosen by competition from over 40 entries. The shopping centre was also nicknamed Hessco's after the well known British supermarket chain, Tesco, and the prison's final occupant.

After British withdrawal
After the Berlin Infantry Brigade was dissolved in mid-1994 the Britannia Centre Spandau lost its name and became the only unnamed shopping centre in Berlin. It was used by Kaiser's Tengelmann, ALDI, Media Markt and a few small companies. In late 2008 Media Markt left the main shopping complex leaving the space abandoned. In 2011 the new owner, a development company, applied for permission to demolish the cinema complex of the Britannia Centre. The cinema complex in question was used by ALDI until October 2011. The contracts for both the cinema complex and the shopping complex, which at this time housed Kaiser's, were terminated. Kaiser's left the Shopping Complex on 31 December 2011. 

By May 2013 the cinema complex had vanished and the shopping complex had been changed far beyond recognition. The massive glass dome that once sat atop the complex has also been removed. On 20 June 2013, a Kaufland center opened inside.

Landmark protection
The old two and three-story buildings, which currently house doctors’ surgeries and other businesses, are all listed as protected landmarks in the Berliner Landesdenkmalliste. The two main buildings were not protected, therefore the responsible office at the Bezirksamt Spandau was unable to refuse the request for demolition.

External links and references

Bibliography 

British Army deployments
20th century in Berlin